A1 Team Germany was the German team of A1 Grand Prix, an international racing series. The team were the A1 Grand Prix champions for the second season, 2006-07. They were run by the English Super Nova Racing team until the end of 2007-08. GU-Racing took over for 
2008-09, but the team missed the first four rounds.

Management 

Rolf Beisswanger took over the role of seat holder from Willi Weber, in preparation for 2009.

History

2005–06 season 
Drivers: Timo Scheider, Sebastian Stahl, Adrian Sutil

The team had a mediocre season, finishing at a disappointing 15th place in the championship.

2006–07 season 
Drivers: Nico Hülkenberg, Christian Vietoris

Team Germany clinched the A1GP title, with a dominant, and almost singlehanded performance by Nico Hülkenberg, scoring nine victories, and beating nearest rivals New Zealand by 35 points.

2007–08 season 
Drivers: Michael Ammermüller, Christian Vietoris

Team Germany fell from grace in 2007–08. Although the team won two races, Michael Ammermüller was excluded from two races for his overly aggressive driving style.

2008–09 season 
Drivers: André Lotterer, Michael Ammermüller

Drivers

Complete A1 Grand Prix results 

(key), "spr" indicate a Sprint Race, "fea" indicate a Main Race.

References

External links

A1gp.com Official A1 Grand Prix Web Site
A1 Team Germany

German A1 team
German auto racing teams
2005 establishments in Germany
A
Auto racing teams established in 2005
Auto racing teams disestablished in 2009